Falmouth is an unincorporated community located in Suwannee County, Florida, United States.

There is one recreational area, known as Falmouth Spring. Falmouth Spring is a first-magnitude spring flowing about 160 cubic feet per second. It is located within a 276-acre recreation area managed by the Suwannee River Water Management District. The majority of the area is sandhill and upland mixed forest, with some slash pine. Because it disappears underground shortly after bubbling up, Falmouth Spring has been called the world's smallest river.

Falmouth is the birthplace of Dan White (March 25, 1908 – July 7, 1980), American actor in vaudeville, theater, radio, film and television

References 

Unincorporated communities in Suwannee County, Florida
Unincorporated communities in Florida